Blooming Grove Township is one of the eighteen townships of Richland County, Ohio, United States.  It is a part of the Mansfield Metropolitan Statistical Area.  The 2000 census found 1,157 people in the township.

Geography
Located in the northern part of the county, it borders the following townships:
Greenwich Township, Huron County - northeast
Butler Township - east
Weller Township - southeast corner
Franklin Township - south
Jackson Township - southwest corner
Cass Township - west
Ripley Township, Huron County - northwest

No municipalities are located in Blooming Grove Township.

Name and history
It is the only Blooming Grove Township statewide.

Blooming Grove Township was organized 4 March 1816 from two-thirds of Madison Township. Blooming Grove Township was reduced in extent by partitions which formed other townships. When Ashland County was formed in 1846, the western two columns of sections that had been a part of old Clear Creek Township were attached to make Blooming Grove six miles long by eight miles wide. When Butler Township was created on 5 February 1849 by combining the Clear Creek addition and two columns of sections from the east part of Blooming Grove, the township assumed its present size of six miles long by four miles wide.

Government
The township is governed by a three-member board of trustees, who are elected in November of odd-numbered years to a four-year term beginning on the following January 1. Two are elected in the year after the presidential election and one is elected in the year before it. There is also an elected township fiscal officer, who serves a four-year term beginning on April 1 of the year after the election, which is held in November of the year before the presidential election. Vacancies in the fiscal officership or on the board of trustees are filled by the remaining trustees.

References

External links
County website

Townships in Richland County, Ohio
Townships in Ohio